Cyperus endlichii is a species of sedge that is native to northern and north eastern areas of Tanzania.

The species was first formally described by the botanist Georg Kükenthal in 1925.

See also
 List of Cyperus species

References

endlichii
Plants described in 1925
Taxa named by Georg Kükenthal
Flora of Tanzania